Pomaderris walshii, commonly known as Carrington Falls pomaderris, is a species of flowering plant in the family Rhamnaceae and is endemic to a restricted area of New South Wales. It is a shrub or small tree with hairy young stems, narrowly egg-shaped leaves, and panicles of cream-coloured to yellow flowers.

Description
Flowering occurs from July to November.

Taxonomy
Pomaderris walshii was first formally described in 2005 by Jacqueline C. Millott and Keith Leonard McDougall in the journal  Telopea from specimens collected in 2003 by Millott from Budderoo National Park. The specific epithet (walshii) honours Neville Grant Walsh.

Distribution and habitat
Carrington Falls pomaderris grows in shrubland near watercourses and is only known from the upper Kangaroo River and its tributaries, above the escarpment near Robertson on the Central Tablelands of New South Wales.

Conservation status
Pomaderris walshii is listed as "critically endangered" under the Australian Government Environment Protection and Biodiversity Conservation Act 1999 and under the New South Wales Government Biodiversity Conservation Act 2016. The main threats to the species include flood damage during high rainfall events, inappropriate fire regimes and the species' small population size and limited distribution.

References

Flora of New South Wales
walshii
Plants described in 2005